FileHippo is a software downloading website that offers computer software for Windows. The website has sections listing most recently updated programs and most popular downloads, organised by category, with program information and link. Registration is not required in this website.  Before the acquisition by Softonic the FileHippo website, funded by user donations and third-party advertising, had an Update Checker, later renamed App Manager, a free program that scanned a computer for outdated software and offered links to more recent versions.

FileHippo was established in 2004 by the UK-based technology company Well Known Media. The site added a news section in 2014. FileHippo was estimated to be worth over US$13,000,000 in November 2015. FileHippo does not accept software submissions from publishers. Softonic later acquired FileHippo;  the FileHippo home page states "Softonic International, S.A. holds the license to use the name and logo of Filehippo".

References

External links
FileHippo.com

Download websites